Ramona Park Broke My Heart (stylized in all caps) is the fifth studio album by American rapper Vince Staples, released April 8, 2022, through Motown Records and Blacksmith Records. The album was executive produced by Corey "Blacksmith" Smyth, Ethiopia Habtemariam, Michael Uzowuru, and Vince Staples himself.

Background and promotion
Ramona Park Broke My Heart is named after Ramona Park, the neighborhood of Long Beach, California where Staples grew up. The album's first single, "Magic", was released on February 14, 2022, with an accompanying music video following on March 7. The album's second single, "Rose Street", was released on March 28.

Critical reception

Ramona Park Broke My Heart was met with widespread critical acclaim. At Metacritic, which assigns a normalized rating out of 100 to reviews from professional publications, the album received an average score of 82, based on 10 reviews. Aggregator AnyDecentMusic? gave it 7.8 out of 10, based on their assessment of the critical consensus.

Robin Murray from Clash enjoyed the album, saying, "A brave record that asks awkward questions both of its maker and his audience, Ramona Park Broke My Heart is a document of personal evolution and what its possible to bring along with you". Reviewing the album for AllMusic, Fred Thomas stated, "Staples goes even deeper into memory and self-reflection on Ramona Park Broke My Heart, presenting his pain, glory, and contradictory emotions in sharper definition while turning in some of his most engaging music to date". Matthew Ismael Ruiz of Pitchfork said, "The companion piece to his 2021 self-titled record diverges from the innovation and technical proficiency in favor of introspection and contemplation. It is a richly detailed, deadpan elegy for his stolen youth". Beats Per Minute critic Marc Griffin said, "Ramona Park Broke My Heart is an illusion; Vince Staples' latest LP finds him making far more ear-catching music than his previous effort, but the infectious beats and choruses are merely a facade". Wesley McLean of Exclaim! praised the album, stating, "It's a near-perfect encapsulation of every enticing aspect of his previous work, wrapped into one project". Writing for NME, Kyann-Sian Williams stated, "The production is clean, the rhymes imaginative and the rapper digs deeper than ever before. Yes, Vince Staples was a beautifully personal reflection from start to finish, but Ramona Park… deepens the listener's relationship with the rapper".

Karl Blakesley of Gigwise said, "This is easily Vince's strongest and most ambitious work since Big Fish Theory. An album that sounds great, but also offers an intricately crafted and at times brutally honest portrait of his hometown, highlighting the maze of social traps from which he was lucky enough to escape". In a positive review, Spectrum Cultures Aaron Paskin said, "Tragic accounts of violence surround a guarded Vince Staples, who raps not proudly but unapologetically about his dedication to the hustle, his anxiety, and ultimately his inability to love, all stemming from his tumultuous upbringing in Long Beach".

Year-end lists

Track listing

Notes
  signifies a co-producer
 Track names are stylized in all caps.

Personnel
Credits adapted from liner notes.

Musicians
 Vince Staples – rap vocals
 Sean Matsukawa – additional keyboards, additional vocals, guitar, percussion (2)
 Zack Sekoff – additional keyboards, keyboard arrangements, guitar, percussion (2)
 Mustard – additional vocals (4)
 Nick Lee – horn (4)
 Cory Henry – keyboards (4)
 Dylan Wiggins – additional keyboards (5)
 Reske – additional vocals (7)
 Lil Baby – vocals (7)
 Vision – additional vocals (8)
 Ty Dolla Sign – rap vocals (10)
 Nami – additional keyboards (11)

Technical
 Corey "Blacksmith" Smyth – executive producer
 Ethiopia Habtemariam – executive producer
 Michael Uzowuru – executive producer
 Vince Staples – executive producer
 Chris Gehringer – mastering
 Mark "Spike" Stent – mixing, sound engineering
 Kenny Beats – recording (1, 3, 4, 7, 10, 13, 15, 16)
 Tyler Page – recording (2–6, 8–14)
 Angie Randisi – recording (7)
 Will Quinnell – mastering assistance
 Matt Wolach – mixing assistance, additional engineering
 David Pizzimenti – recording assistance (4)
 Hayden Duncan – recording assistance (4, 6)
 Armin Lopez – recording assistance (8)

Charts

References

2022 albums
Vince Staples albums
Albums produced by DJ Dahi
Albums produced by DJ Mustard
Albums produced by Kenny Beats
Motown albums